Choe Myeong-gil (7 October 1586 – June 19, 1647) was a Korean Joseon politician and Neo-Confucian scholar of the Yangmingist school who came from the Jeonju Choe clan. He served as the Joseon Chief State Councilor from 1638 to 1640 and 1642 to 1644.

Works
 Jicheon Yujip (지천유집 遲川遺集)
 Jicheon Jucha (지천주차 遲川奏箚)

Family
Father: Choe Gi-nam (최기남, 崔起南; 1559–1619)
Grandfather: Choe Su-jun (최수준, 崔秀俊)
Mother: Lady Yu of the Jeonju Yu clan (정경부인 전주 유씨, 貞敬夫人 全州 柳氏; 1556–1615)
Grandfather: Yu Yeong-rip (유영립, 柳永立; 1537–1599)
 Siblings
Older brother: Choe Nae-gil, Prince Wancheon (최내길 완천군, 崔來吉 完川君; 1583–1649)
Younger brother: Choe Hye-gil (최혜길, 崔惠吉; 1591–1662)
Younger brother: Choe Ga-gil (최가길, 崔嘉吉)
Wives and children:
Lady Jang of the Indong Jang clan (정경부인 인동 장씨, 貞敬夫人 仁同 張氏); eldest daughter of Jang-Man (장만, 張晩) – No issue, so they adopted Choe Hye-gil's 2nd son.
Adopted son: Choe Hu-ryang, Prince Walleung (최후량 완릉군, 崔後亮 完陵君; 1616–1693)
Adopted daughter-in-law: Ahn Jung-im, Lady Ahn of the Gwangju Ahn clan (안중임 광주 안씨, 安仲任 廣州 安氏; 1621–1673); eldest daughter of Ahn Heon-jing (안헌징, 安獻徵)
Grandson: Choe Seok-jin (최석진, 崔錫晉; b. 1640)
Grandson: Choe Seok-jeong (최석정, 崔錫鼎; 1646–1715); become the adoptive son of his uncle, Choe Hu-sang
 Granddaughter-in-law: Lady Yi Gyeong-eok (이경억, 李慶億)
 Great-Grandson: Choe Chang-dae (최창대, 崔昌大)
Grandson: Choe Seok-hang (최석항, 崔錫恒; 1654–1724)
Granddaughter: Lady Choe Du-sik (최두식, 崔斗息; b. 1651)
Grandson-in-law: Yun Je-myeong (윤제명, 尹濟明)
Granddaughter: Lady Choe Dan-sik (최단식, 崔端息; b. 1656)
Grandson-in-law: Shin Gok (신곡, 申轂)
Lady Heo of the Yangcheon Heo clan (정경부인 양천 허씨, 貞敬夫人 陽川 許氏); daughter of Heo In (허인, 許嶙)
Son: Choe Hu-sang (최후상, 崔後尙; 1631–1680) – No issue, so he adopted Choe Hu-ryang's 2nd son.
Unnamed concubine (첩)
Daughter: Lady Choe (최씨, 崔氏)
Son-in-law: Gu Hoeng (구횡, 具鐄; b. 1638) of the Neungseong Gu clan; son of Gu In-hu, Internal Prince Neungcheon (구인후 능천부원군, 具仁垕 綾川府院君)

In popular culture

Drama and Television series 
Portrayed by Kim Sung-won in the 1981 KBS1 TV Series Daemyeong.
 Portrayed by Kim Ha-kyun in the 2013 JTBC TV series Blooded Palace: The War of Flowers.
 Portrayed by Jeon No-min in the 2014 tvN TV series The Three Musketeers.
 Portrayed by Im Ho in the 2015  MBC TV series Splendid Politics.
 Portrayed by Lee Byung-hun in the 2017 film The Fortress.

Webtoon 
 Portrayed in the 2019 KakaoPage Webtoon series Finally, The Blue Flame

See also 
 Kim Jip
 Kim Yuk

References

External links
 Choe Myeong-gil:Navercast 
 Choe Myeong-gil, Korean historical person information 
 Kim Haboush, JaHyun and Martina Deuchler (1999). Culture and the State in Late Chosŏn Korea.  Cambridge: Harvard University Press. ;  OCLC 40926015
 Lee, Peter H. (1993). Sourcebook of Korean Civilization, Vol.  1. New York: Columbia University Press. ; ; ;  OCLC 26353271
 Noh, Daehwan. "The Eclectic Development of Neo-Confucianism and Statecraft from the 18th to the 19th Century," Korea Journal. Winter 2003.

1586 births
1647 deaths
Neo-Confucian scholars
Korean educators
17th-century Korean poets
Joseon scholar-officials
Korean scholars
Korean Confucianists
17th-century Korean philosophers
Myeong-gil